Stieger Lake or Steiger Lake is a lake in Carver County, Minnesota, in the United States.

Stieger Lake was named for Carl Stieger, an early settler.

References

Lakes of Minnesota
Lakes of Carver County, Minnesota